Devil's Lake or Devils Lake may refer to:

Settlements
 Devil's Lake, Michigan, U.S.
 Devils Lake, North Dakota, U.S.
Devils Lake station

Lakes
 Devils Lake (Michigan), U.S., the name of several lakes
 Devils Lake (Minnesota), U.S.
 Devils Lake (North Dakota), U.S.
 Devils Lake (Deschutes County, Oregon), U.S.
 Devils Lake (Lincoln County, Oregon), U.S.
 Devil's Lake (Wisconsin), U.S.
 Teufelssee ('Devil's Lake'), Berlin, Germany
 Lake Chyortovo, Yamalo-Nenets Autonomous Okrug, Russia

Other uses
 Devil's Lake State Park (disambiguation)
 Devils Lake Sioux Tribe, former name of the Spirit Lake Tribe of North Dakota

See also